Malah may refer to:

Places
El Malah, formerly Rio Salado, municipality in northwestern Algeria
El Malah District, a district in Algeria
Ouled Malah, town and commune in Algeria
 Malah (Al-Suwayda Governorate) - town in the Salkhad District of the Al-Suwayda Governorate in Syria
Tell Malah, Syrian town in Hama Governorate in Syria

See also
Brit malah or Brit milah, Jewish ceremony held for covenant of circumcision for Jewish males